Cortes de Arenoso is a municipality of Spain in the Valencian Community, in the province of Castellón.

References

Municipalities in the Province of Castellón